Pericoma signata is a species of moth fly in the family Psychodidae.

References

Psychodidae
Articles created by Qbugbot
Insects described in 1901